Henrik Moisander (born 29 September 1985) is a Finnish former professional footballer.

Career
Moisander began his career 2001 in the youth from TPS Turku, before 2003 joined to Ajax Amsterdam, in August 2006 left Ajax and moved to Assyriska Föreningen. He played one season with Assyriska, before being transferred to TPS Turku.

Moisander made his professional debut for TPS Turku in a league match against FC Haka on 25 June 2008. After one year he left the club for Vaasan Palloseura in November 2008. In March 2010, Moisander moved back to TPS Turku, then moved to Åbo IFK in August of that same year. Following a return to TPS in 2011, Moisander was named in the Veikkausliiga August Team of the Month, alongside teammate Jarkko Hurme.

In October 2013, Moisander joined FC Lahti, arriving alongside Jani Tanska. He made his league debut for the club on 13 April 2014 in a 1–1 away draw with MYPA, playing all ninety minutes of the match.

In February 2016, Moisander moved to FC Inter Turku. He made his league debut for the club on 9 April 2016 in a 1–1 home draw with his former club, FC Lahti.

International
He has played three matches for Finland's U19 team.

Personal life
He is the twin brother of Niklas Moisander.

References

External links
 
 Veikkausliiga profile 
 

1985 births
Living people
Association football goalkeepers
Finnish footballers
Finnish expatriate footballers
AFC Ajax players
Turun Palloseura footballers
Vaasan Palloseura players
FC Lahti players
FC Inter Turku players
Finnish twins
Twin sportspeople
Finland international footballers
Footballers from Turku